SPM may refer to:

Places 
 Saint Pierre and Miquelon (ISO 3166-1 code), an overseas French territory
 Salón de la Plástica Mexicana, an art museum in Mexico City
 Salsali Private Museum, Dubai, UAE
 Shyama Prasad Mukherji College, University of Delhi, India
 St Philip's Marsh depot, Bristol, UK, rail depot code

Organizations 
 Socialist Party of Canada (Manitoba)
 Socialist Party of Macedonia
 Somali Patriotic Movement
 Sociedade Portuguesa de Matemática, the Portuguese Mathematical Society

Science and computing 
 Scanning probe microscopy
 Scratchpad memory, in computing
 Self-phase modulation, nonlinear light-matter interaction
 Specialized proresolving mediators, cell signaling molecules
 Standard Progressive Matrices (IQ test)
 Suspended particulate matter

Software 
 Statistical parametric mapping of brain activity

Business and industry 
 Supplier performance management
 Single-point mooring, for tankers

People 
 South Park Mexican, aka SPM, American rapper
 S. P. Muthuraman, Indian film director
 Sean Patrick Maloney, American politician.

Other 
 Akukem language (ISO 639:spm), a Ramu language of Papua New Guinea
 IPCC Summary for Policymakers
 Sijil Pelajaran Malaysia (Malaysian Certificate of Education)
 Super Paper Mario, a video game for the Nintendo Wii